Move or Die is a multiplayer action-puzzle game developed by Romanian indie studio Those Awesome Guys. Move or Die was released on Microsoft Windows on 21 January 2016 and was released on PlayStation 4 on 5 March 2019.

Gameplay
Move or Die is a competitive four-player game in which each player controls one colored blob whose health drops rapidly if they stop moving for a moment, and regenerates if they resume movement. Different rules or modifiers are added in each round, with additional failure states varying between modes. The challenge arises from requiring players to keep moving to win, while avoiding hazards such as death tiles or falling blocks. Players can also attempt to push each other around, including into hazards.

Reception
On review aggregator Metacritic, Move or Die has received "generally favorable" reviews. Hardcore Gamer scored the game 4.5 out of 5, praising its simplicity and multiplayer gameplay, calling it "quite possibly one of the best party games on Steam".

References

External links
 

Puzzle video games
2016 video games
Multiplayer video games
Video games developed in Romania
Windows games
Linux games
MacOS games
PlayStation 4 games